The 1967 WCHA Men's Ice Hockey Tournament was the 8th conference playoff in league history. The tournament was played between March 7 and March 11, 1967. All games were played at home team campus sites. By being declared as co-champions, both Michigan State and North Dakota were invited to participate in the 1967 NCAA University Division Men's Ice Hockey Tournament.

Though not official designations, Michigan State is considered as the East Regional Champion† and North Dakota as the West Regional Champion‡.

Format
All eight teams in the WCHA were eligible for the tournament. In the first round the schools were matched up based upon regional location, having the schools closest to one another play a single game with the winners advancing to the second round. The two Colorado schools (Colorado College and Denver) met in one match, leaving North Dakota to play their closest geographic rival Minnesota. With the Gophers occupied Minnesota-Duluth's next closest opponent was Michigan Tech, leaving Michigan and Michigan State as the pair in the final First Round game. Because each of these teams had met under the same circumstances the previous year the home venue that wasn't used the first time was utilized for this tournament, resulting in two higher-seeded teams playing on the road. After the first round the two easternmost remaining teams met in the home venues of Michigan Tech (Dee Stadium) while the two westernmost schools met at Denver's home building (DU Arena). In the second round the first and fourth seeds and the second and third seeds were matched with the winners being declared as co-conference tournament champions.

Conference standings
Note: GP = Games played; W = Wins; L = Losses; T = Ties; PCT = Winning percentage; GF = Goals for; GA = Goals against

Bracket

Eastern Teams advanced to one final while western teams advanced to the other

Note: * denotes overtime period(s)

First round

(1) North Dakota vs. (8) Minnesota

(2) Denver vs. (7) Colorado College

(3) Michigan Tech vs. (6) Minnesota-Duluth

(4) Michigan vs. (5) Michigan State

Second round

(1) North Dakota vs. (2) Denver

(3) Michigan Tech vs. (5) Michigan State

Tournament awards
None

See also
Western Collegiate Hockey Association men's champions

References

External links
WCHA.com
1966–67 WCHA Standings
1966–67 NCAA Standings
2013–14 Colorado College Tigers Media Guide
2013–14 Denver Pioneers Media Guide
2013–14 Michigan Wolverines Media Guide; Through the Years
2013–14 Michigan State Spartans Media Guide; Section 5
2013–14 Minnesota Golden Gophers Media Guide 
2012–13 Minnesota-Duluth Bulldogs Media Guide
2013–14 North Dakota Hockey Media Guide

WCHA Men's Ice Hockey Tournament
Wcha Men's Ice Hockey Tournament